Back to Front: Live in London is a live album and film by the English rock musician Peter Gabriel, recorded at The O2 in London on 21 and 22 October 2013 during his Back to Front Tour. The release includes the regular recording of the concerts as well as a special "theatrical" version with interviews, directed by Hamish Hamilton.

Back to Front: Live in London was released in the following formats:
DVD
Blu-ray
DVD  Deluxe Book Edition (2 DVD + 2 CD)
Blu-ray Deluxe Book Edition (2 Blu-ray + 2 CD)

Track listing

Personnel
 Peter Gabriel – lead vocals, piano
 David Rhodes – guitar, vocals
 Jennie Abrahamson – vocals, acoustic guitar
 Tony Levin – bass, keyboards, vocals
 David Sancious – keyboards, acoustic guitar, accordion
 Linnea Olsson – vocals, piano
 Manu Katché – drums, percussion
 Daby Touré – guest vocals on "In Your Eyes"

Charts

Weekly charts

Year-end charts

References

Peter Gabriel albums
2014 live albums
2014 video albums
Real World Records video albums
Real World Records live albums
Eagle Rock Entertainment live albums
Eagle Rock Entertainment video albums